Guylaine Berger (born 12 April 1956) is a retired French swimmer who won a bronze medal in the 4 × 100 m freestyle at the 1974 European Aquatics Championships. She also competed in several events at the 1972, 1976 and 1980 Summer Olympics. Her best achievements were sixth place in the 4 × 100 m freestyle in 1976 and seventh in the 100 m freestyle in 1980.

References

1956 births
Living people
Swimmers at the 1972 Summer Olympics
Swimmers at the 1976 Summer Olympics
Swimmers at the 1980 Summer Olympics
Olympic swimmers of France
French female freestyle swimmers
European Aquatics Championships medalists in swimming